The Udokan Range is a mountain range in Sakha Republic (Yakutia) and Zabaykalsky Krai, Russian Federation. The nearest town is Chara.

There is copper mining in the range at the Udokan mine, part of the Udokan Ore Region that includes the Kalar and Kodar ranges. A stretch of the Baikal–Amur Mainline passes through the range following the valley of the Khani river.

History

The Udokan was first described and mapped in 1857 by A.F. Usoltsev, Lieutenant of the Corps of Military Topographers of the Russian Imperial Army.

On 5 July 1965 an Aeroflot Antonov An-2R struck a mountain of the Udokan Range on a flight between Ust-Nyukzha and Chara. The aircraft encountered poor weather with low clouds and rain while flying along the Khani river valley. The wreckage was found on 16 July 1969. There were three fatalities. The An-2 had been operating a Tynda–Ust-Nyukzha–Chara cargo service.

Geography
The Udokan Range rises in the central area of the Stanovoy Highlands, to the south of the upper course of the Chara, a left tributary of the Olyokma. To the north it borders with the Olyokma-Chara Plateau —in the upper reaches of the Chara river. 
To the south the range is bound by the valley of the Khani river, a left tributary of the Olyokma.

The range is part of the Baikal Rift Zone and displays signs of volcanic relief at its southwestern end, in the area where it merges with the Kalar Range.

Hydrography
A number of rivers have their sources in the range, including the Tokko and the Kalar. There are also glacial landforms and sediments that are remnants of Pleistocene glaciation.

Flora
The lower slopes of the range are mainly covered by larch taiga, with pre-alpine woodland, mountain tundra and bare rocky summits (golets) at higher elevations.

See also
Baikal Rift Zone
List of mountains and hills of Russia
List of ultras of Northeast Asia

References

Stanovoy Highlands
Mountain ranges of Russia
Mountain ranges of the Sakha Republic
Mountains of Zabaykalsky Krai

bg:Удокан
pl:Udokan
ru:Удокан (хребет)